Wyoming Highway 70 (WYO 70) is a  state highway in southern Wyoming. The route travels from an intersection with WYO 789 in Baggs eastward to WYO 230 in Riverside. WYO 70 over Battle Pass is closed during winter (November to April). The section of the route within Medicine Bow National Forest is designated the Battle Pass Scenic Byway.

Route description
Wyoming Highway 70 begins in Baggs at Wyoming Highway 789 and heads east through southern Carbon County near the Colorado state line. Highway 70 travels through the communities of Dixon and  Savery before dipping across the state line, where a short section passes through Slater, Colorado (between mileposts 15.34 and 16.24). This short section through Moffat County, Colorado is not part of the Colorado State Highway System, and is maintained by the Wyoming Department of Transportation. At 16.7 miles, Wyoming 70 intersects with former Colorado State Highway 129, which used to connect US 40 with Wyoming 70. It is now Moffat CR 1. After leaving the national forest, Highway 70 passes through Encampment and then on to Riverside, where it ends at its junction with WYO 230.

During the spring of 2011, a landslide occurred on WYO 70 near milepost 31, about halfway between Baggs and Encampment. The slide destroyed a 1,000-foot length of the highway, and the road was closed to through traffic for several weeks. As a result, a temporary one-lane detour was constructed. Reconstruction of the road where the slide occurred was ruled out after geologic investigations found the slide is likely to continue moving in the future. Work to realign WYO 70 around to the north of the slide area is being done. WYDOT anticipates the realignment project would require two construction seasons, during which time the existing detour would be maintained.

On November 15, 2012, The Wyoming Highway Commission designated Wyoming State Highway 70 as the Battle Pass Scenic Byway.   A local support group, Battle Pass Scenic Byway Alliance, Inc. is a non-profit organization that is coordinating the interpretive signage along this unique roadway across the Continental Divide.

History
Between the 1940s and 1960s, Wyoming Highway 70 connected with former Colorado State Highway 129, which used to connect US 40 with Wyoming 70. During the time Highway 129 existed, WY 70 didn't exist as it does now. Only the western part from SH 129 to Baggs was designated as Highway 70. Former Colorado State Highway 129 is now Routt County Route 129.

Recreation

The Continental Divide Trail traverses Battle Pass. Resupply is available in the nearby Town of Encampment to the east. Local camping is available just north of the highway. In 2010 a small trailer was parked just off the highway on private property for the use of thru-hikers.

Major intersections

See also

References

External links

 Wyoming Routes 000-099
 WYO 70 - WYO 789 to Colorado State Line
 WYO 70 - Colorado State Line to Colorado State Line
 WYO 70 - Colorado State Line to WYO 230
 Carbon County, WY webpage
 Carbon County, WY - Battle Highway
 Wyoming Highway 70 photos
 Wyoming Highway 70

Transportation in Carbon County, Wyoming
070